Francis Xavier Richter Jr. (July 12, 1910 – November 20, 1977) was a Canadian politician, who served as a Member of the Legislative Assembly and Minister of Agriculture and Minister of Mines in the Social Credit government of W.A.C. Bennett in the province of British Columbia. He represented the riding of Similkameen from 1953 to 1966 and its successor riding Boundary-Similkameen from 1966 to 1975.

Born in Keremeos, British Columbia, he was the youngest son of Frank Richter, Sr., who settled in the Similkameen Country of the Southern Interior of British Columbia in 1864 and became a successful rancher and entrepreneur there, and his wife, Florence Elizabeth Loudon.  The elder Richter had five daughters and six sons, of whom the youngest was Frank Jr.

Richter was a cattle rancher and fruit grower. He died at Brentwood Bay at the age of 67.

References

Encyclopedia of Ghost Towns and Mining Camps of British Columbia: Volume 2, The Similkameen, Boundary and Okanagan, T.W. Paterson, Sunfire Publications, Langley B.C. (1981)  
Strangers Entertained: A History of the Ethnic Groups of British Columbia, John Norris, British Columbia Centenenial '71 Committee, Evergreen Press, Vancouver (1971) (no ISBN)

1910 births
1977 deaths
Similkameen Country
Canadian people of Austrian descent
British Columbia Social Credit Party MLAs